The Brandywine Building is a 19-story, 260 foot high rise building in downtown Wilmington, Delaware. It contains primarily office and commercial space. The building was originally built in 1970 as an expansion for DuPont's Headquarters, but is now mostly used by Citi.

History 

1968 - The Brandywine Building begins construction.
1970 - The Brandywine Building finishes construction and was primarily used by DuPont as an expansion for their downtown headquarters.
2005 - DuPont moves out of the Brandywine Building as they began to downsize. 
2006 - Citi moves into the Brandywine Building.
2017 - The Brandywine Building is only 47% occupied by Citi, and is having a hard time attracting tenants.

See also 

List of tallest buildings in Wilmington, Delaware
DuPont
Citi

References 

 Emporis.com
 http://www.delawareonline.com/story/news/2017/08/18/brandywine-building-step-away-sheriffs-sale/580599001/
 http://www.delawareonline.com/story/money/business/2017/08/25/old-buildings-barrier-wilmingtons-growth/590813001/

Skyscrapers in Wilmington, Delaware
Skyscraper office buildings in Delaware
Office buildings completed in 1970
1970 establishments in Delaware